In enzymology, a D-xylose 1-dehydrogenase is an enzyme that catalyzes the chemical reaction

D-xylose + NAD+  D-xylonolactone + NADH + H+

Thus, the two substrates of this enzyme are D-xylose and NAD+, whereas its 3 products are D-xylonolactone, NADH, and H+.

This enzyme belongs to the family of oxidoreductases, specifically those acting on the CH-OH group of donor with NAD+ or NADP+ as acceptor. The systematic name of this enzyme class is D-xylose:NAD+ 1-oxidoreductase. Other names in common use include NAD+-D-xylose dehydrogenase, D-xylose dehydrogenase, and (NAD+)-linked D-xylose dehydrogenase. This enzyme participates in pentose and glucuronate interconversions.

References

 

EC 1.1.1
NADH-dependent enzymes
Enzymes of unknown structure